The International Union of Sex Workers (IUSW) is a United Kingdom-based trade union for sex workers. It campaigns for the decriminalisation of prostitution, and to have sex work acknowledged as viable labour. In 2002, members voted to affiliate with the GMB, a general workers union. The union now has official recognition as the sex industry branch of the GMB. Some of the services offered by the union include: self-defence classes, free legal advice and training for members who wish to leave the sex industry.

The union was formed in 2000 partly as a response to actions taken by Westminster City Council in London to try to remove prostitutes from the area.

They are a member of Backlash, a pressure group formed in 2005 in order to oppose a new law criminalising possession of "extreme pornography".

See also

 Labour rights
 Pornography in the United Kingdom
 Prostitution in the United Kingdom
 Sex workers' rights

References

 Arthur Ivor Marsh, Victoria Ryan, "Historical Directory of Trade Unions: Including unions in printing and publishing, local government, retail and distribution, domestic services, general employment, financial services, agriculture", Historical Directory of Trade Unions vol.5, Ashgate Publishing, Ltd., 2006, p. 330

External links
 International Union of Sex Workers
 x:talk Project

Sex worker organizations
Sex industry
Sexuality in the United Kingdom
Lobbying organisations in the United Kingdom
Political advocacy groups in the United Kingdom
Sex positivism
2000 establishments in the United Kingdom
GMB (trade union) amalgamations